Turid is a Norwegian feminine given name. Notable people with the name include:

Turid Balke (1921–2000), Norwegian actress, playwright and artist
Turid Birkeland (born 1962), Norwegian cultural executive and former politician for the Labour Party
Turid Hundstad (born 1945), Norwegian civil servant
Turid Iversen (born 1934), Norwegian politician for the Conservative Party
Turid Karlsen, Norwegian operatic soprano and voice teacher who has had an active international performing career since the 1980s
Turid Knaak (born 1991), German footballer
Turid Leirvoll (born 1956), Norwegian and Danish politician who was Party Secretary of the Socialist Left Party from 1993 to 2001
Turid Kjellmann Pedersen (1937–2012), Norwegian politician for the Labour Party
Turid Rugaas, Norwegian dog trainer
Turid Sannes, Norwegian handball player
Turið Sigurðardóttir (born 1946), Faroese educator, writer and translator, specializing in the history of Faroese literature
Turid Smedsgård, Norwegian former handball goalkeeper
Turid Thomassen (born 1965), Norwegian politician who was party leader of the Norwegian left-wing party Red from 2010 to 2012
Turid Torkilsdottir (c. 960 – c. 1047), powerful influential woman during the Viking Age in the Faroe Islands
Turid Dørumsgaard Varsi (born 1938), Norwegian politician for the Labour Party

See also
TURYID
Tiurida
Tubrid
Turd

Norwegian feminine given names